Jami-Ul-Alfar Mosque (
(known colloquially as the Samman Kottu Palli, Rathu Palliya, Red Masjid or the Red Mosque) is a historic mosque in Colombo, Sri Lanka.  It is located on Second Cross Street in Pettah. The mosque is one of the oldest mosques in Colombo and a popular tourist site in the city.

History 
Construction of the Jami-Ul-Alfar Mosque commenced in 1908 and the building was completed in 1909. The mosque was commissioned by the local Indian Muslim community, based in Pettah, to fulfill their required five-times-daily prayer and Jummah on Fridays. The mosque's designer and builder was Habibu Lebbe Saibu Lebbe (an unlettered architect), and was based on details/images of Indo-Saracenic structures provided by South Indian traders, who commissioned him. It is a hybrid style of architecture, that draws elements from native Indo-Islamic and Indian architecture, and combines it with the Gothic revival and Neo-classical styles. Originally it had the capacity for 1,500 worshippers although at the time only around 500 were attending prayers.

It is a distinctive red and white candy-striped two-storey building, with a clock tower, and is reminiscent of the Jamek Mosque in Kuala Lumpur, Malaysia (constructed in 1910).
Before other landmarks were built, some claim that the Jami Ul-Alfar Mosque was recognised as the landmark of Colombo by sailors approaching the port.

In 1975 the mosque, with the assistance of the Haji Omar Trust, purchased a number of the adjoining properties and commenced building an expansion to the mosque to increase its capacity to 10,000.

See also
 Islam in Sri Lanka

References

Mosques in Colombo
Mosques completed in 1909
Tourist attractions in Colombo